Tania Ahmed is a Bangladeshi actress, model, choreographer and director. She won Bangladesh National Film Award for Best Supporting Actress for her role in the film Krishnopokkho (2016).

Career
Ahmed started her career as a model in 1991. She debuted her acting career in the TV play Samporko, directed by Faria Hossain. Later on, she played in other notable TV dramas - 69, Belabhumi, Srikanto, Amader Anandabari, Ghunpoka and Shukhnagar Apartment. Ahmed has also directed music videos since 1999.

2001–2005
She directed music video of "Muhurto", "Moyuree", "Aar Koto Kandabe", and "Uro Megh". In 2004, she acted in Humayun Ahmed's film  Shyamol Chhaya and earned Bachsas Film Award for Best Supporting Actress for her role in the movie.

2006–2010
She has acted in Mostofa Sarwar Farooki's Made in Bangladesh and in a short film Biswaronner Nodi.

2011–2018
She became the judge of Veet Channel i Top Model in 2011. She directed a serial named A Team in 2012 in England and telecasted on Channel-i in 2013. In 2014, Ahmed debuted in directorial role in the movie Valobasha Emoni Hoy (Good Morning London) released in January 2017.

Personal life
She was born in June 5.
She was married to musician S I Tutul since 1999. The couple officially divorced on 2021. Together they have three sons - Tawab, Sreyash and Arosh.

Television works

Directed dramas

Awards
Bachsas Film Award
 Best Supporting Actress for Shyamol Chhaya in 2004

References

External links
 

Living people
Bangladeshi film actresses
Bangladeshi television actresses
Bangladeshi women film directors
Year of birth missing (living people)
Best Supporting Actress National Film Award (Bangladesh) winners
Best Supporting Actress Bachsas Award winners